The 1904 Michigan State Normal Normalites football team represented Michigan State Normal College (later renamed Eastern Michigan University) during the 1904 college football season.  In their first season under head coach Daniel H. Lawrence, the Normalites compiled a record of 6–2. However, they were outscored by a combined total of 159 to 121, as a result of routs at the hands of Albion (0–68) and the University of Michigan freshman team (0–43). Sherman R. Wilson was the team captain.

Schedule

References

Michigan State Normal
Eastern Michigan Eagles football seasons
Michigan State Normal Normalites football